Mohamed Raza Hassanali Dharamsi (born 18 July 1962), popularly known as Mohamed Raza, is a Zanzibari businessman and CCM politician currently representing the Uzini constituency in the Zanzibar House of Representatives.

Early life and education
Raza was born in the Sultanate of Zanzibar to parents of Indian ancestry. He was educated at the Shaaban Robert Secondary School from 1977 to 1980.

Political career
He was elected in February 2012 to represent the Uzini constituency in the Zanzibar House of Representatives. He was sworn into office on 28 March 2012.

References

External links
 

1962 births
Living people
Chama Cha Mapinduzi politicians
Members of the Zanzibar House of Representatives
Shaaban Robert Secondary School alumni
Tanzanian Muslims
Tanzanian politicians of Indian descent